Heterogeneous nuclear ribonucleoprotein H3 is a protein that in humans is encoded by the HNRNPH3 gene.

This gene belongs to the subfamily of ubiquitously expressed heterogeneous nuclear ribonucleoproteins (hnRNPs). The hnRNPs are RNA binding proteins and they complex with heterogeneous nuclear RNA (hnRNA). 

These proteins are associated with pre-mRNAs in the nucleus and appear to influence pre-mRNA processing and other aspects of mRNA metabolism and transport. While all of the hnRNPs are present in the nucleus, some seem to shuttle between the nucleus and the cytoplasm. The hnRNP proteins have distinct nucleic acid binding properties. 

The protein encoded by this gene has two repeats of quasi-RRM domains that bind to RNAs. It is localized in nuclear bodies of the nucleus. This protein is involved in the splicing process and it also participates in early heat shock-induced splicing arrest by transiently leaving the hnRNP complexes. Multiple alternative transcript variants seem to be present for this gene and some appear to have intronic regions in the mRNA. Presently, only two transcript variants are fully described.

References

Further reading